Michael F. McAllister (born December 1, 1964) is a retired United States Coast Guard vice admiral who last served as commander of the Coast Guard Pacific Area and Defense Force West from June 30, 2021 to July 8, 2022. He most recently served as Deputy Commandant for Mission Support and, prior to that, as commander of the Coast Guard Seventeenth District.

McAllister graduated from the United States Coast Guard Academy in 1986 with a Bachelor of Science degree in civil engineering. He later earned a Master of Science degree in civil engineering from the University of Illinois at Urbana–Champaign in 1991. McAllister is a registered professional engineer in the state of Washington. He also received a Master of Business Administration degree from the Massachusetts Institute of Technology in 2004.

References

1964 births
Living people
People from Somerville, Massachusetts
United States Coast Guard Academy alumni
Grainger College of Engineering alumni
American civil engineers
MIT Sloan School of Management alumni
Recipients of the Meritorious Service Medal (United States)
Recipients of the Legion of Merit
United States Coast Guard admirals
Recipients of the Defense Superior Service Medal
Recipients of the Coast Guard Distinguished Service Medal
Military personnel from Massachusetts